Rosicley Pereira da Silva (born 22 April 1993), commonly known as Rossi, is a Brazilian professional footballer who plays mainly as a right winger for Al-Faisaly.

Club career
Born in Prainha, Pará, Rossi represented Flamengo and Fluminense before joining Ponte Preta in 2011. On 22 January 2012 he made his first team debut, coming on as a second half substitute for Caio in a 0–1 Campeonato Paulista away loss against São Caetano.

Rossi made his Série A debut on 11 November 2012, replacing Rildo in a 1–0 home win against Internacional. After not being utilized during the first half of the 2013 season, he was loaned to Mogi Mirim until the end of the year on 14 May.

Returning to Ponte ahead of the 2014 campaign, Rossi appeared sparingly as his side achieved top tier promotion. The following year, he served loan stints at Paraná and Operário Ferroviário.

On 21 December 2015, Rossi joined São Bento permanently. The following 23 May, he signed for Série B side Goiás.

Rossi was the club's second top goalscorer of the Esmeraldino during the 2016 campaign, only two goals shy of Léo Gamalho; highlights included a brace in a 4–2 home win over Náutico on 16 July. On 21 December, after failing to agree new terms, he moved to Chapecoense in the Série A.

On 14 July 2017, Rossi signed for China League One side Shenzhen.

He transferred to Internacional on loan in March 2018.

On 13 January 2022, Rossi joined Saudi Arabian club Al-Faisaly.

Career statistics

Club

Notes

Honours 
Chapecoense
 Campeonato Catarinense: 2017

Bahia
 Campeonato Baiano: 2020
 Copa do Nordeste: 2021

References

External links

1993 births
Living people
Sportspeople from Pará
Brazilian footballers
Association football forwards
Campeonato Brasileiro Série A players
Campeonato Brasileiro Série B players
Campeonato Brasileiro Série C players
Campeonato Brasileiro Série D players
Associação Atlética Ponte Preta players
Mogi Mirim Esporte Clube players
Paraná Clube players
Operário Ferroviário Esporte Clube players
Esporte Clube São Bento players
Goiás Esporte Clube players
Associação Chapecoense de Futebol players
Shenzhen F.C. players
Sport Club Internacional players
CR Vasco da Gama players
Esporte Clube Bahia players
Al-Faisaly FC players
China League One players
Saudi Professional League players
Saudi First Division League players
Brazilian expatriate footballers
Expatriate footballers in China
Brazilian expatriate sportspeople in China
Expatriate footballers in Saudi Arabia
Brazilian expatriate sportspeople in Saudi Arabia